Szkaradowo  is a village in the administrative district of Gmina Jutrosin, within Rawicz County, Greater Poland Voivodeship, in west-central Poland.

The village has a population of 1,000.

References

Szkaradowo